Ashon T. Crawley is an American scholar of religion and author. He is Associate Professor of Religious Studies and African American and African Studies at the University of Virginia and author of Blackpentecostal Breath: The Aesthetics of Possibility on aesthetics and performance as modes of social imagination, and The Lonely Letters, an epistolary, semi-autobiographical work on love, blackness, mysticism, and quantum theory. The Lonely Letters won the 2021 Lambda Literary Award for LGBTQ Nonfiction and the Believer Book Award for nonfiction Crawley is currently working on two books about the Hammond Organ’s historical role in the Black Church and social life.

Education
Crawley earned a bachelor of arts from the University of Pennsylvania in 2003, then received a master of theological studies from Emory University in 2007. In 2013, completed his PhD at Duke University.

Bibliography

 Blackpentecostal Breath: The Aesthetics of Possibility, published October 3, 2016 by Fordham University Press
 The Lonely Letters, published April 10, 2020 by Duke University Press

Awards and honors

References

External links 

 Official website
Crawley reading from The Lonely Letters
 Appearances on NPR
 Writing for the Los Angeles Review of Books

University of Virginia faculty
University of Pennsylvania alumni
Emory University alumni
Duke University alumni
Year of birth missing (living people)
Living people